To my peoples! was a manifesto signed by Emperor Franz Joseph I of Austria-Hungary in Bad Ischl on July 28, 1914. The text announced the Austro-Hungarian entry into World War I and the declaration of war on Serbia, starting World War I.

Background
"To my people" was a typical headline of war manifestoes; it was used in the declaration of war on Prussia in 1866 and in the announcement of the Italian entry into World War I (against Austria-Hungary) in 1915. Because Austria-Hungary was a multi-ethnic empire, 'people' was made plural.

After the assassination of Archduke Franz Ferdinand of Austria, heir to the Austro-Hungarian throne, and his wife Sophie in Sarajevo (Bosnia and Herzegovina) on June 28, 1914, diplomatic relations between Austria-Hungary and Serbia became strained. After weeks of discussions, government and army leaders of the Empire decided to risk war with Serbia, hoping for a short and victorious campaign. 

Emperor Franz Joseph signed the declaration of war in his Imperial Villa in Bad Ischl on July 28. The document was distributed all over the empire and was widely published on the morning of the next day. At this time, several European countries had already started to mobilize their armies. 

The text presents the aggressiveness of Serbia as the reason for the war, claiming that the Empire had tried all the ways to avoid the conflict. The document was signed by Franz Joseph and Karl von Stürgkh, minister-president of Austria. The belief of some that a peaceful solution could be still reached was quickly dashed - all political parties, including the Social Democrats, expressed their support for the war.

On July 29, Belgrade was bombed for the first time. On July 31, Austria-Hungary announced a general mobilization and, on August 12, the invasion of Serbia started. Other European powers entered World War I in early August.

English translation

External links
 The text in German, in Czech
 English translation at Project Gutenberg
 World War 1: Declaration of War in Foreign Lands: Austria-Hungary
 "Austro-Hungarian Government Has Declared War on Serbia," The Ogden Standard. (Ogden City, Utah), 28 July 1914. Chronicling America: Historic American Newspapers. Library of Congress.

Declarations of war during World War I
1914 in Austria-Hungary
1914 in international relations
July 1914 events
1914 documents